Christopher Bernard Tanzey (born 6 March 1957) is an English-Australian former footballer and manager.

Career
In his playing career, Tanzey was a professional with Liverpool, playing for the club's reserve side. He then played in Australia for Downer Olympic in the ACT League, and later Griffith City FC and Tuggeranong United. He also played futsal for the Canberra Strikers in Australia's National Indoor Soccer League. He represented Australia at the 1985 FIFUSA Futsal World Cup in Spain. He later coached various teams, including Canberra City Griffins youth, Downer Olympic, Canberra Croatia Reserves and Canberra City, and led football at the ACT Academy of Sport and Australian Institute of Sport.

Tanzey was the head coach of the Australia women's soccer team at the 2000 Summer Olympics. He was also the coach of the Belconnen Blue Devils during the 2003–04 NSW Premier League season, earning the coach of the year award.

Personal life
Tanzey is a native of Birkenhead, England, but moved to Australia during his career.

References

External links
 

1957 births
Living people
Sportspeople from Birkenhead
English footballers
Australian soccer players
English emigrants to Australia
Association football defenders
Association football midfielders
English men's futsal players
Australian men's futsal players
Futsal defenders
English expatriate footballers
English expatriate sportspeople in Australia
Expatriate soccer players in Australia
Liverpool F.C. players
English football managers
Australian soccer coaches
Women's association football managers
Australia women's national soccer team managers